The Pudong Football Stadium, currently named SAIC Motor Pudong Arena due to sponsorship reasons, is a football stadium in Shanghai, China. Completed in October 2020, it is the home of Chinese Super League club Shanghai Port. The stadium has a capacity for 37,000 spectators.

Construction
Construction began on 28 April 2018 according to the construction plans of HPP Architekten. The white metal exterior design of the stadium is based on the reminiscent of a Chinese porcelain bowl.

Events
On 4 June 2019, China was announced as the host of the 2023 AFC Asian Cup. It was subsequently reported that the final and one semi-final would be held at the venue. However, in May 2022, China withdrew from hosting the tournament due to the COVID-19 pandemic in China.

On 31 October 2020, the venue hosted the final match of the 2020 League of Legends World Championship, which was also the inaugural event at the stadium.

References

External links
HPP Architects project page

Football venues in Shanghai
Esports venues in China
Sports venues in Shanghai
Sports venues completed in 2020
2020 establishments in China
Multi-purpose stadiums in China